Luz Filomena Salgado Rubianes de Paredes (born 3 July 1949) is a Peruvian Fujimorist politician and journalist who served as President of the Congress thrice, from 2016 to 2017 as a full-term and twice briefly in 2000 in an acting capacity.

Education and professional career

Luz Salgado studied communication sciences at the Universidad San Martín de Porres. She studied additionally for a master's degree in the Center for Higher National Studies.

Political career

Writing the Peruvian Constitution
In aftermath of Alberto Fujimori's self-coup on April 5, 1992, Luz Salgado was elected as a member of the Democratic Constitutional Congress, which wrote a new constitution during the Peruvian Constitutional Crisis of 1992. During this period she worked closely with de facto Intelligence Chief Vladimiro Montesinos.

Congresswoman and Party politics
In the 1990 elections, Salgado ran for deputy for the Lima constituency under the Cambio 90 party, but she was not elected. Five years later in the 1995 elections, Salgado was elected to Congress under the Cambio 90-New Majority list. In the 2000 elections, she was re-elected on the Peru 2000 list and again in the 2001 elections under the Cambio 90-New Majority list but in August 2001, she was suspended from Congress.

In the 2011 general election, after a ten-year absence, she was elected to the Congress on the Fuerza 2011 list, representing Lima for the 2011–2016 term and in the 2016 elections on the Fuerza Popular list, for the 2016–2021 term, but her term was cut short by the dissolution of Congress by Martín Vizcarra in September 2019.  At the time of her retirement, Salgado held the fifth position in seniority in the Congress of the Republic, with 17 years as a member of Congress in six non-consecutive terms.

References

External links

Official Site
Presidential Official Site 

Living people
Fujimorista politicians
1949 births
Members of the Democratic Constituent Congress
Members of the Congress of the Republic of Peru
People from Lima
Presidents of the Congress of the Republic of Peru
20th-century Peruvian women politicians
20th-century Peruvian politicians
21st-century Peruvian women politicians
21st-century Peruvian politicians
Women members of the Congress of the Republic of Peru